Kardinia Park (also known as GMHBA Stadium due to naming rights) is a sporting and entertainment venue located within Kardinia Park, South Geelong, in the Australian state of Victoria. The stadium, which is owned and operated by the Kardinia Park Stadium Trust, is the home ground of AFL club Geelong Football Club. The capacity of Kardinia Park is 36,000, making it the largest-capacity Australian stadium in a regional city.

Australian rules football

Early years
Football has been played on Kardinia Park since the 19th century, and prior to the 1940s, Kardinia Park was the secondary football venue in the city of Geelong; Corio Oval was the primary venue, and the Geelong Football Club played its Victorian Football League games at that venue until 1940. Kardinia Park served as the home ground for the Geelong (A.) Football Club in the Victorian Football Association from 1922 until 1925, before that club moved to the Western Oval in Geelong West; local and district football was played regularly on the ground.

The Geelong Football Club began playing its home games at Kardinia Park in 1941 after Corio Oval was commandeered by the military during World War II, and it became its permanent home venue thereafter.

Recent history
On 23 May 2002, Kardinia Park hosted a visit from the Dalai Lama, who again visited the stadium in June 2007.

Kardinia Park is regarded as a proverbial graveyard for teams playing against Geelong, which has an especially good record at the ground. Geelong did not lose a single match played at the venue between 26 August 2007 and 27 August 2011. Geelong's Jimmy Bartel credited the home-field advantage to the fact that Geelong is one of the few clubs which practices on the same field that it plays on.

On 22 June 2011, it was announced the stadium would have a new name in 2012. After 10 years as naming rights sponsor of Skilled Stadium, Skilled Group decided to relinquish these rights as of 31 October 2011. Previous names of the stadium as results of sponsorship deals have been Skilled Stadium, Shell Stadium and Baytec Stadium; however it was only called Baytec Stadium for less than two months, and only one pre-season match was played there under the name. The stadium is nicknamed "The Cattery" by the club's supporters.

On 30 July 2011, Geelong recorded its largest ever victory, and the second-largest victory in V/AFL history when it defeated  by 186 points. The Cats' score of 37.11 (233) was their second-highest score in club history, and the highest ever score recorded at Kardinia Park.

Floodlights were installed prior to the 2013 AFL season, and the venue staged its first night match during the season.

On 7 September 2013, Kardinia Park hosted its first ever AFL Final, a qualifying final against Fremantle Dockers, with Geelong losing the game 87–72.

In its current layout Kardinia Park consists of the following seating areas: the Reg Hickey Stand, Players Stand, Premiership Stand, Brownlow Stand, Ford Stand/Fred Flanagan Room and the Gary Ablett Terrace, with the latter containing the main standing room section.

On 4 July 2021, the venue hosted its 689th V/AFL match, but its first ever AFL home and away fixture not involving Geelong, as Sydney Swans hosted West Coast Eagles due to the COVID-19 pandemic in New South Wales causing a lockdown in the Greater Sydney area. Sydney won 118–26 with the attendance posted of 9,520.

Cricket
In 2016, it was announced that international cricket would be played at the ground for the first time. The ground hosted second T20 International between Australia and Sri Lanka on 19 February. The ground witnessed memorable match between two nations, where Sri Lanka won the match by 2 wickets at the end. Sri Lanka chased 173 runs at the last ball of the match.

On 3 January 2018 the ground hosted a Women's Big Bash League and Big Bash League double header with the Melbourne Renegades taking on the Sydney Sixers with the Renegades winning in both matches.

The ground was confirmed to be one of the venues used in the 2020 ICC T20 World Cup. However, due to the impact of the COVID-19 pandemic, the tournament was postponed to October 2021 with United Arab Emirates and Oman hosting instead of Australia who hosted the 2022 ICC T20 World Cup instead.

Soccer
In August 2019, it was announced that new A-League club Western United would play the majority of home matches at Kardinia Park for the upcoming 2019/20 season and for a further two or three years. The club had planned to play most home matches at Kardinia Park until moving into their proposed new stadium in Tarneit in Melbourne's West. Their first game at the ground was a 1–1 draw with Perth Glory in front of 6,088 on 19 October 2019. Western United last played matches at Kardinia Park in December 2021.

Kardinia Park was included in the Australia 2022 FIFA World Cup bid, with a proposed upgrade to 44,000 seats analogous to the later proposed stage 5 of redevelopment, with the new multi tiered stand stretching all the way from the southern end, around the western side and the northern Ablett stand, however the bid lost out to Qatar.

 
Soccer team Melbourne Victory FC occasionally plays at Kardinia Park. After a seven-year gap between their first match, a 2007 A-League Pre-Season Challenge Cup match against Newcastle Jets and their second, a 2014 AFC Champions League qualifying play-off against Thai side Muangthong United, the ground hosted its first-ever A-League premiership match in 2015 when Victory played Perth Glory FC in round 14 of the 2014–15 A-League season with an attendance of 21,289 as the first match of a three-year deal to bring one Victory fixture per season to Geelong. The second match drew 14,268 fans to an exciting six-goal, come-from-behind draw by the Victory against Central Coast Mariners in January 2016, while the third was held on 2 January 2017 with Newcastle Jets as the visiting team, when a crowd of 14,081 witnessed Besart Berisha overtake Archie Thompson's all-time A-League scoring record in a 4–2 win for the Victory. Victory and the stadium trust agreed to extend the deal by two more years in 2017.

European Champions League finalists Atlético Madrid played Melbourne Victory in a friendly match at the stadium on 31 July 2016. Melbourne Victory won 1–0.

The stadium has also played host to one full men's international match on 30 December 2014, a pre-tournament friendly between Bahrain and Saudi Arabia prior to the 2015 AFC Asian Cup hosted by Australia, which ended as a 4–1 win for Bahrain.

The Australian women's national team, the Matildas, won a friendly match against China 5–1 on 26 November 2017, attracting a crowd of 6,338 even with a thunderstorm which forced a delay to the match of half an hour.

Other uses
During the late 1920s and early 1930s when Motorcycle speedway was becoming popular throughout Australia, Kardinia Park was home to a dirt track speedway known as the Geelong Velodrome. The Velodrome hosted the inaugural Victorian Solo Speedway Championship in 1926/27 and followed up with the second championship held in 1927/28. Both championships were won by Billy Pilgrim.

On 4 March 2022, American band Foo Fighters performed at the venue marking the first stadium show in the country after the COVID-19 pandemic in Australia.

Redevelopments

Over a twenty-year period between 2003 and 2023, Kardinia Park has undergone an extensive redevelopment of its grandstands, and spectator and interior facilities. A 28 million redevelopment of the stadium was announced in 2003, with A$13.5 million in funding from the Victorian Government, A$4.5 million from the Geelong Football Club, and A$2 million from the AFL. The redeveloped ground was opened on 1 May 2005 during the first home game of the 2005 season. It included a new western entry and membership area, as well as the five-level wing-side grandstand with a capacity of approximately 6,000 spectators on the eastern side of the stadium.

A favourite for the honour of the naming of the new stand was Bob Davis, coach of the Cats' premiership side in 1963. On 15 June 2005, City of Greater Geelong councillors granted the club its wish to change the name of the new eastern stand to the Reg Hickey Stand, while the southern stand became the Doug Wade Stand. The northern terrace became known as the Gary Ablett Terrace while the western gate was renamed the Bob Davis Gate.

In September 2007, Kardinia Park received a further total of A$25 million towards the rebuilding of the Ross Drew Stand on the south western side of the ground. Funding for the project included A$14 million from the Federal Government and A$6 million from the Victorian Government. The new stand, known as the Premiership Stand, features seating for 4,500 supporters, including up to 800 corporate guests on match days. The stand opened on 10 April 2010 and was officially unveiled in round four of the 2010 AFL season, coinciding with the unveiling of the 2009 premiership flag. A$50,000 was also spent on a new 600-seat temporary stand between the Reg Hickey and Doug Wade stands.

In May 2009 it was revealed that the stadium owners the City of Greater Geelong had approached a number of Melbourne-based AFL clubs discussing the financial advantages of playing home games at the ground. Though such a move never eventuated, the ground was capable of earning other clubs A$30 a patron, compared to the A$7 a patron earned at Docklands Stadium in Melbourne. The Geelong Football Club had first floated Skilled Stadium as a potential home game venue for Melbourne clubs in 2006.

In April 2011, plans for the third stage of redevelopment were revealed. Under the plans, the Doug Wade stand at the southern end of the stadium was pulled down at the end of the 2011 AFL season. The works included the demolition of the old Doug Wade stand and the construction of a new approximately 9,000 seat Southern Grandstand. The new Grandstand also included improved spectator amenities, a purpose-built training facility for community sports and education groups, a "past players" function room, and four broadcast-compliant floodlit towers, allowing the stadium to host night events. The redevelopment saw the stadium increase in capacity to 34,500. The redevelopment cost $33 million, of which $11.7 million was spent on the new lighting.

Significant miscalculations were made with respect to the budget required for the stage 3 redevelopment and consequently several aspects of the original plans were scaled back by the Geelong Football Club in November 2011, including the removal of the proposed supporters lounge and decreasing capacity by 1,000 seats. The new grandstand was named the Players Stand in August 2012 and from 1 November 2011, the venue became known as Simonds Stadium, after homebuilding group Simonds Homes signed a five-year naming rights deal.

The new Players Stand was officially opened on 1 June 2013, prior to Geelong's first proper home match of the 2013 AFL season against Gold Coast. The match was the first to be played under the new floodlights and was played before 30,082 fans, the largest crowd at the stadium at that time since the first stage of the re-development.

The Brownlow and the Jennings Stands were pulled down at the end of the 2015 season to make way for a new state of the art grandstand. The new stand, eventually named the Brownlow Stand (in honour of the club's Brownlow Medal winners and Mr. Charles Brownlow) was opened on 18 May 2017. The new stand features seating for 6,500 people, improved media facilities, a new 1000-seat function centre, merchandise store, café, an enhanced football department and the "Sunrise Centre", a community facility providing rehabilitation for people returning to the workforce following serious injury.

The total cost of the fourth stage of redevelopment was $91 million, of which $75m came from the Victorian Government, $6m from the City of Greater Geelong, $6 million from the Geelong Football Club and $4 million from the AFL. The total capacity of Kardinia Park after the stage 4 redevelopment is nominally 36,000; however, given the way the stadium is configured for AFL matches, its capacity is said to be unable to exceed 34,000.

During 2016 laws were passed by the Victorian Parliament for management of the stadium to be taken over by the government-appointed Kardinia Park Stadium Trust, in line with practices at other major venues in the state. Prior to this the venue had been owned and operated by the City of Greater Geelong, which now maintains and manages the broader Kardinia Park precinct, though not the actual stadium itself.

In April 2017, the Victorian Government announced an investment of $3.9 million in the upcoming state budget to fund the planning and design stage for Stage 5 of the redevelopment. The proposed redevelopment would be the final part of the more than decade-long process to increase the capacity of Kardinia Park to 40,000 and will result in the Ford Stand and Gary Ablett Terrace being removed for the new stand to ring around the remaining open-air section of the stadium. In November 2020 the government revealed it had assigned $142 million to complete this final stage of the redevelopment. The new grandstand will hold 14,000 spectators and will include function rooms, administrative offices and broadcast studios, cricket warm-up facilities and standing room facilities for spectators. Construction commenced in September 2021. Due to the commencement of construction associated with Stage Five of the stadium's redevelopment, the stadium's capacity was reduced to as low as 23,000 at times.

Despite being originally planned to be completed by mid-2023, the fifth stage of redevelopment was delayed by imported steel that did not meet Australian standards. The stand is expected to open in early 2024.

Since January 2018, the stadium has been commercially named GMHBA Stadium.

Hosted events
Australian Football League
Victorian Football League
Geelong Football League finals series
Victorian Premier Cricket for the Geelong Cricket Club
KFC Twenty20 Big Bash
A-League
A-League Pre-Season Challenge Cup
W-League (Australia)
AFC Champions League
Big Bash League
National Rugby Championship
2022 ICC Men's T20 World Cup

Attendance records

Last updated 22 September 2013

Last updated 12 July 2022

 Sources

VFL/AFL records
Players
 Most games played: Ian Nankervis, 138
 Most goals kicked: Doug Wade (/), 413

Teams
 Highest score:  37.11 (233) defeated  7.5 (47), 30 July 2011
 Lowest score:  1.8 (14) defeated by  9.15 (69), 10 August 2019
 Biggest margin:  defeated , 186 points, 30 July 2011
 Longest winning streak: , 29 games, 2008–2011

Last updated: 11 August 2019.

Dimensions
Length – 170m
Width – 115m
Goals run north to south

Source

The field is the narrowest playing field used for AFL games; however, many other venues are much shorter (with Sydney Cricket Ground being the shortest).

Naming rights sponsors
1999–2001: Shell
2002: Baytec
2002–11: Skilled
2012–17: Simonds
2018–present: GMHBA

Notes

References

External links

Official Website

"Around the Grounds" – Web Documentary – Kardinia Park

Sports venues completed in 1941
Australian Football League grounds
Victorian Football League grounds
Buildings and structures in Geelong
Geelong Football Club
World Series Cricket venues
Sport in Geelong
Sports venues in Victoria (Australia)
Rugby league stadiums in Australia
Rugby union stadiums in Australia
Soccer venues in Victoria (Australia)
Cricket grounds in Australia
AFL Women's grounds
Western United FC
A-League Men stadiums
A-League Women stadiums